Sanukran Thinjom is a Thai professional footballer who plays as a midfielder for Thai League 1 club Chiangrai United.

Honours

Club
Muangthong United
 Thai League Cup (1): 2017
 Thailand Champions Cup (1): 2017
 Mekong Club Championship (1): 2017

Chiangrai United
 Thai FA Cup (1): 2020–21
Thailand Champions Cup (1): 2020

References

External links

Living people
1993 births
Sanukran Thinjom
Sanukran Thinjom
Association football midfielders
Sanukran Thinjom
Sanukran Thinjom
Sanukran Thinjom
Sanukran Thinjom
Sanukran Thinjom
Sanukran Thinjom
Sanukran Thinjom
Sanukran Thinjom